Real Sporting San José is a Spanish football team based in Las Palmas, in the autonomous community of Canary Islands. Founded in 1913, it plays in Tercera División – Group 12, holding home matches at Estadio Chano Cruz.

Season to season

5 seasons in Tercera División

External links
La Preferente team profile 
Soccerway team profile

Football clubs in the Canary Islands
Sport in Las Palmas
Association football clubs established in 1913
1913 establishments in Spain